The violet-tailed sunbird (Anthreptes aurantius) is a species of bird in the family Nectariniidae. It is found near water in forest, scrub and mangrove in the Central African countries of Angola, Cameroon, Central African Republic, Republic of the Congo, Democratic Republic of the Congo, and Gabon. It is part of the violet-backed sunbird superspecies.

References

violet-tailed sunbird
Birds of Central Africa
violet-tailed sunbird
Taxonomy articles created by Polbot